Mudhugauv is a 2016 Malayalam caper-comedy film written and directed by Vipin Das in his directional debut. It is produced by Vijay Babu and Sandra Thomas under the banner, Friday Film House. It marks the acting debut of Gokul Suresh, son of Malayalam actor Suresh Gopi, and Arthana, daughter of Malayalam actor Vijayakumar. It also stars Vijay Babu, Baiju, Indrans, Soubin Shahir,  Hareesh Perumanna & Disney James along with Prem Kumar, Abu Salim, Sunil Sukhada, Anil Murali, Sharu & Anand in supporting roles. The film's title is derived from the popular catchphrase from the 1994 cult classic Thenmavin Kombath. The original score and songs are composed, arranged and produced by Rahul Raj.

Plot
Bharath, a technical student, has a habit of kissing people nearby when he is both stressed and happy, disregarding social situations. Bharath, from his first sight of Ganga, falls in love with her. Somewhere in Thiruvananthapuram city an infamous gangster Ramakrishnan Bonacaud, aka Rambo, has a face to face confrontation with CI Pathmanabhan, aka Padayappa; grumpy Rambo becomes annoyed and plans to kill Pathmanabhan soon before leaving Kerala. Meanwhile, Bharath is able to requite love from Ganga and one night he stays with Ganga. After this incident Ganga starts to react hypochondriacally and suspects she is pregnant with Bharath's child and preoccupiedly behaves in the gravity of the same. Rambo is able to sketch Pathmanabhan through two bumbling goons, but before executing Pathmanabhan publicly, shoots his own urinary bladder using his suppressed gun due to an unexpected kiss from Bharath (who has just got confirmation on Ganga's love). Rambo, who after the accident has urinary incontinence and is attached to a urine drainage bag permanently, is enraged and asks his right-hand man to round up everyone involved. All the while the police plan to trap Rambo, once and for all, understanding him to be not just a business man but a Don. They set up a meeting with Rambo through Kumari and Putheri on Rambo's hotel terrace. Rambo calls Bharath's number (which Putheri has obtained) and it keeps ringing. Unexpectedly, Bharath comes to the hotel's terrace to discuss with Ganga their problem of confirming whether she is pregnant or not through a pregnancy test kit and switches off his phone. Everyone on the terrace is frozen and unsure on how to respond. Knowing Ganga isn't pregnant, Bharath looks to kiss someone, sees Rambo, and runs towards him to kiss; they both fall. Immediately a shootout starts between the Police and Rambo's gang. Bharath and Ganga escapes through the staircase. Rambo follows and corners them near a balcony. Pathmanabhan fires his gun; it distracts Rambo, he slips on urine from his detached catheter and falls from the balcony to the sea. Police try to find Rambo's body and they are unable to find it. Policemen involved are promised promotions from political leaders. Bharath, back at home after legal proceedings, promises (at his mother's insistence) before his late father's photo to not kiss anyone whom he doesn't know. It is revealed that his father Chandran happens to be a man whom Rambo had murdered in his early days. In the credits it is shown that Rambo is washed up on a beach and a couple of cannibals are surrounding him.

Cast

 Gokul Suresh as Bharath
 Arthana as Ganga, Bharath's love interest 
 Vijay Babu as Ramakrishnan Bonacaud aka Rambo, Notorious Gangster 
 Soubin Shahir as Kumari
 Hareesh Perumanna as Putheri
 Baiju as CI Pathmanabhan aka Padayappa 
 Abu Salim as Please, Rambo's Right-hand man
 Arun Kumar as Tony
 Indrans as Pathmanabhan's alcoholic uncle 
 Prem Kumar as Chief Minister
 Subhash Nair as Sub Inspector
 Santhosh Keezhattoor as Chandran, Bharath's father (cameo)
 Neena Kurup as Lakshmi, Bharath's mother
 Aparna Nair as nurse (cameo)
 Sunil Sukhada as Marwadi moneylender
 Disney James as Disney the carjacker 
 Devi Ajith as external examiner (cameo)
 Tony Alex Valluvassery
 Aju Varghese as Bruno (cameo)
 Anil Murali as Thampi
 Pradeep Kottayam as doctor 
 Anand Kumar as Commissioner 
 KPAC Leelamani as vegetable seller
 Vineeth (cameo)
 Vaisakh Velayudhan as Bharath's friend
 Dhyan Sreenivasan as Tribal Gang Member (Cameo)

Music
All songs are composed, arranged and programmed by Rahul Raj. The official soundtrack which contains 3 original songs and one violin reprise was met with positive reviews upon release. Rahul Raj's background score, which includes an unreleased remix version of "Rambo", too received unanimous praise in the film's reviews.

Track listing

References

External links 

2016 films
2010s Malayalam-language films
Films scored by Rahul Raj